Chang Eui-jong (born April 1, 1969, in Gokseong) is a former tennis player from South Korea, who represented his native country as a qualifier at the 1992 Summer Olympics in Barcelona, where he was defeated in the first round by Spain's eventual runner up Jordi Arrese. The right-hander reached his highest singles ATP ranking on June 17, 1991, when he became number 245 in the world.

External links
 
 
 

1969 births
Living people
South Korean male tennis players
Tennis players at the 1992 Summer Olympics
Olympic tennis players of South Korea
Sportspeople from South Jeolla Province
Asian Games medalists in tennis
Tennis players at the 1994 Asian Games
Universiade medalists in tennis
Medalists at the 1994 Asian Games
Asian Games silver medalists for South Korea
Asian Games bronze medalists for South Korea
Universiade gold medalists for South Korea
Medalists at the 1991 Summer Universiade
20th-century South Korean people